Point Blank Radio also known as Point Blank FM is a London based DAB and online radio station specialising in house music and other forms of classic and contemporary electronic music, with shows also focussing on a wider range of genres such as  soul, jazz and world music.

Point Blank first broadcast in 1994 as a  pirate radio station from West London.

In April 2021, it was announced that the station would soon to join the Surrey DAB Mux. It commenced licensed broadcasting on 26 June 2021.

References

External links 
 Official website

Radio stations in London
Internet radio stations in the United Kingdom